The Philips :YES was a home computer/personal computer released by Philips Austria, in 1985. It was not fully IBM PC compatible, a reason given for its commercial failure. The system was only sold in limited quantities.

Technical specifications
 Microprocessor: Intel 80186 @ 8 MHz
 ROM: 192 KiB
 RAM: 128 to 640 KiB
 Keyboard: mechanical, with 93 keys
 Operating system: DOS Plus (in 64 KiB ROM), MS-DOS, Concurrent DOS
 Storage: two 3½-inch drives, 720 KiB each. One or two optional external 3½-inch or 5¼-inch drives.
 Video modes:
 A0: Text, 40 columns × 25 rows, 8 colours
 A1: Text, 80 columns × 25 rows, 8 colours
 A2: Text, 80 columns × 25 rows, 2 colours + intensity
 G0: 160 × 252 pixels, 16 colours 
 G1: 640 × 252 pixels, 2 colours + intensity
 G2: 320 × 252 pixels, 16 colours 
 G3: 640 × 252 pixels, 4 colours

The built-in graphics hardware (based on the Hitachi HD46505SP video controller) supported composite video output. An additional video module allowed output to TTL monochrome monitors, colour monitors or SCART televisions.

Video RAM was shared with system RAM. Before using graphics modes, memory had to be allocated for them with the GRAPHICS or GRCHAR commands.

An expansion card (the Professional Expansion Board) provided:
 Extra RAM.
 A SASI/SCSI hard-drive interface.
 A mouse interface.
 A battery-backed real-time clock.

An additional expansion card was available in limited quantity (probably only sold in the Netherlands directly to Philips employees) to make it 100% IBM PC compatible. This card was made of two separate cards, one for the actual compatibility, which ended in an 8 bit ISA slot, where an Hercules Graphics Card monochrome videocard was plugged in. This also meant that using this card, would require to plug the monitor into the new videocard, bypassing the onboard graphical card. This expansion card made it possible to run all DOS programs (including popular games at that time).

Operating system versions
Known operating systems adapted for the Philips :YES include:

 DOS Plus 1.? in ROM (with BDOS 4.1). The BDOS in ROM does not implement the S_OSVER call, which would have returned the version number to display.
 DOS Plus 1.1 on disk (with BDOS 4.1)
 DOS Plus 1.2 on disk (with BDOS 4.1)
 DOS Plus 2.1 on disk (with BDOS 5.0)

 Concurrent DOS

 MS-DOS 2.??
 MS-DOS 3.10

See also
Rodime (manufacturer of internal hard disk)
MSX-DOS

References

External links
 Computermuseum München: Philips :Yes (in German)
  (with pictures)

Personal computers
Philips products